Emily Jane Seebohm, OAM (born 5 June 1992) is an Australian swimmer and television personality. She has appeared at four Olympic Games between 2008 and 2021; and won three Olympic gold medals, five world championship gold medals and seven Commonwealth Games gold medals.

In 2009, Seebohm was awarded the Medal of the Order of Australia.

Seebohm appeared as a contestant in the 8th season of the Australian version of I'm a Celebrity...Get Me Out of Here! in January 2022. Later the same year, she competed on The Challenge: Australia.

Early life and education
Seebohm was born on 5 June 1992 in Adelaide, South Australia. At age two, Seebohm and her family moved to Brisbane, Queensland so her mother Karen could coach swimming. Her father John Seebohm was also an accomplished footballer in the SANFL, who played over 300 games for the Glenelg Tigers. Growing up, Seebohm attended St Joseph's Catholic Primary School, St Margaret's Anglican Girls School and St John Fisher College, a Catholic school for girls.

Career
At the age of 14, Seebohm won the 100 m backstroke at the 2007 Australian Championships, the selection meet for the 2007 World Aquatics Championships. At the World Championships in Melbourne, Seebohm won a gold medal in the 4 × 100 m medley relay.  She also placed fourth in the final of the 100 m backstroke and 14th in the 50 m backstroke.

Seebohm also won gold in both the 100 m backstroke and 4 × 100 m medley relay at the 2007 Junior Pan Pacific Swimming Championships.

On 6 March 2008 at the Brisbane Catholic Schoolgirls Championships, Seebohm broke the  50 m backstroke Commonwealth and Australian records with a time 28.10 seconds, missing Li Yang's then world record of 28.09 by one hundredth of a second.

On 22 March 2008, Seebohm broke the world record in the 50 m backstroke  in the semi-finals of the 2008 Australian Championships, with a time of 27.95s, taking five hundredths of a second off Hayley McGregory's world record of 28.00 set only 15 days earlier on 7 March 2008. A day later, this record was beaten again, this time by Australian Sophie Edington in a time of 27.67 seconds in the final of the same event. Seebohm decided not to swim in the final of this event as it is not an Olympic event and instead decided to focus on the semi-final of the 100 m backstroke. Her decision paid off when she became the first Australian woman to break the one-minute barrier in the event, her 59.78 making her the fifth-fastest of all-time. She then lowered the record to 59.58 s in the final, winning the Australian championship and gaining selection for the Olympic Games in Beijing.

At the 2008 Summer Olympics, Seebohm placed ninth overall in the 100 m backstroke, barely missing a spot in the final.  Seebohm then swam in both the preliminaries and final of the 4 × 100 m medley relay, in which Australia won the gold medal.

At the 2009 World Aquatics Championships in Rome, Seebohm won the bronze medal in the 100 m backstroke with a time of 58.88.  She also won silver in the 4 × 100 m medley relay, and placed 7th in the 50 m backstroke and 15th in the 200 m IM.

At the 2009 Australian Short Course Championships, Seebohm broke the world record in the 100 m IM in 58.54.

At the 2010 Pan Pacific Swimming Championships, on the first night she defeated Olympic champion Natalie Coughlin in the 100 m backstroke, taking gold in championship record time, as well as taking silver in the 50 m butterfly. On the second night, she took silver in the 100 m freestyle in her first attempt at the event at international level. On night 3 she took another silver in the 4 × 100 m freestyle relay. Final night saw her take the gold in the 200 m individual medley, topping world champion and record holder Ariana Kukors. Later on in the night she broke the 100 m backstroke championship record in the lead off leg of the 4 × 100 m medley relay, Australia finished with silver. Later on in the year she collected 8 medals at the 2010 Commonwealth Games

Seebohm was tracked by the BBC as part of their series World Olympic Dreams, which followed her as she prepared for London 2012.

At the 2012 London Olympics, Seebohm set a new Olympic record in a 100m backstroke qualifier and was heavily backed to win the gold in the final of the event but fell just short and gained a silver medal.

At the 2013 Australian Swimming Championships she won gold in the 50 m and 100 m backstroke and silver in 200 m individual medley and bronze in the 200 m backstroke events, qualifying for the 2013 World Aquatics Championships. At the World Championships, she teamed up with Bronte Campbell, Emma McKeon and Brittany Elmslie in the heats of the 4 × 100 m freestyle, finishing second in their heat and overall. In the final sisters Cate and Bronte Campbell, Emma McKeon and Alicia Coutts won the silver medal, finishing 0.12 seconds behind the United States.

At the 2016 Summer Olympics, Seebohm represented Australia in both the 100 m and 200 m backstroke and won silver in the 4 × 100 m medley relay.

In June 2021, Seebohm qualified for the 2020 Summer Olympics after finishing second in the 100m backstroke event at the Australian Olympic trials in a time of 58.59. The Tokyo Olympics were Seebohm's fourth consecutive Olympic Games, making her only one of three Australian swimmers to compete at four Olympic Games. At those Olympics she won a gold medal in the 4 x 100 metre medley relay, and a bronze medal in 200 metre backstroke.

International Swimming League 
In the Autumn of 2019 she was member of the inaugural International Swimming League swimming for the Energy Standard International Swim Club, who won the team title in Las Vegas, Nevada, in December.

Career Best Times

Long course metres (50 m pool)

Short course metres (25 m pool)

World records

Long course metres

 split 1:00.79 (1st leg); with Leisel Jones (2nd leg), Jessica Schipper (3rd leg), Libby Lenton (4th leg)
 split 59.33 (1st leg); with Leisel Jones (2nd leg), Jessica Schipper (3rd leg), Libby Trickett (4th leg)

Short course metres

Olympic records

Long course metres

 split 59.33 (backstroke leg); with Leisel Jones (breaststroke leg ), Jessicah Schipper (butterfly leg), Libby Trickett (freestyle leg)

Personal life
Seebohm has a swimming complex, 'The Emily Seebohm Aquatic Centre', named after her in Bracken Ridge.

Seebohm has endometriosis and is an ambassador for the non-profit organisation Endometriosis Australia 

In 2015, Seebohm began a relationship with fellow swimmer, Mitch Larkin. The couple owned a house together in Hendra, Brisbane. In July 2018, Seebohm announced their separation. In 2019, Seebohm moved on with breakfast radio host David Lutteral, however after more than a year of dating, the pair split in March 2021. Seebohm confirmed in December 2022 that she was dating Ryan Gallagher, who she met while filming The Challenge Australia. In March 2023, the pair announced their engagement.

See also
List of Olympic medalists in swimming (women)
List of World Aquatics Championships medalists in swimming (women)
List of Commonwealth Games medallists in swimming (women)
World record progression 50 metres backstroke
World record progression 100 metres individual medley
World record progression 4 × 100 metres medley relay

References

External links
  (archive 2)
 
 
 
 

1992 births
Living people
Australian people of German descent
World record holders in swimming
Olympic swimmers of Australia
Swimmers at the 2008 Summer Olympics
Swimmers at the 2012 Summer Olympics
Olympic gold medalists for Australia
Olympic silver medalists for Australia
Olympic bronze medalists for Australia
Sportswomen from South Australia
Recipients of the Medal of the Order of Australia
Swimmers at the 2010 Commonwealth Games
Commonwealth Games gold medallists for Australia
Commonwealth Games silver medallists for Australia
Commonwealth Games bronze medallists for Australia
World record setters in swimming
World Aquatics Championships medalists in swimming
Australian female freestyle swimmers
Australian female medley swimmers
Australian female backstroke swimmers
Australian female butterfly swimmers
Medalists at the 2008 Summer Olympics
Medalists at the 2012 Summer Olympics
Medalists at the 2020 Summer Olympics
Swimmers at the 2014 Commonwealth Games
Sportspeople from Adelaide
Medalists at the FINA World Swimming Championships (25 m)
Swimmers at the 2016 Summer Olympics
Medalists at the 2016 Summer Olympics
Olympic gold medalists in swimming
Olympic silver medalists in swimming
Olympic bronze medalists in swimming
Commonwealth Games medallists in swimming
People educated at St Margaret's Anglican Girls' School
Swimmers at the 2020 Summer Olympics
I'm a Celebrity...Get Me Out of Here! (Australian TV series) participants
The Challenge (TV series) contestants
Medallists at the 2010 Commonwealth Games
Medallists at the 2014 Commonwealth Games
People with Endometriosis